Greater Houston, designated by the United States Office of Management and Budget as Houston–The Woodlands–Sugar Land, is the fifth-most populous metropolitan statistical area in the United States, encompassing nine counties along the Gulf Coast in Southeast Texas. With a population of 7,122,240 in 2020, Greater Houston is the second-most populous in Texas after the Dallas–Fort Worth metroplex.

The approximately  region centers on Harris County, the third-most populous county in the U.S., which contains the city of Houston—the largest economic and cultural center of the South—with a population of more than 2.3 million. Greater Houston is part of the Texas Triangle megaregion along with the Dallas–Fort Worth metroplex, Greater Austin, and Greater San Antonio. Greater Houston also serves as a major anchor and economic hub for the Gulf Coast. Its Port of Houston is the second largest port in the United States, sixteenth largest in the world, and leads the U.S. in international trade.

Greater Houston has historically been among the fastest-growing metropolitan areas in the United States; it was the fastest-growing in absolute terms during the 2013–2014 census year, adding 156,371 people. The area grew 25.2% between 1990 and 2000—adding more than 950,000 people—while the country's population increased only 13.2% over the same period, and from 2000 to 2007 alone, the area added over 910,000 people. The Greater Houston Partnership projected the metropolitan area would add between 4.1 and 8.3 million new residents between 2010 and 2050.

Greater Houston has the seventh-highest metropolitan-area gross domestic product in the United States, valued at $490 billion in 2017. A major trade center anchored by the Port of Houston, Houston–The Woodlands–Sugar Land has the highest trade export value of all metropolitan areas, at over $120 billion in 2018, accounting for 42% of the total exports of Texas. As of 2021, Greater Houston is home to the headquarters of 24 Fortune 500 companies, ranking third among all metropolitan statistical areas. The Greater Houston metropolitan area was ranked the fourth-most diverse metropolitan area in the United States in 2012.

Geography

The region is slightly smaller than the U.S. state of Massachusetts and slightly larger than New Jersey. The U.S. Office of Management and Budget combines the Houston–The Woodlands–Sugar Land metropolis with four micropolitan statistical areas (Bay City, Brenham, El Campo, and Huntsville) to form the Houston–The Woodlands, TX combined statistical area.

The metropolitan area is located in the Gulf Coastal Plains biome, and its vegetation is classified as temperate grassland. Much of the urbanized area was built on forested land, marshes, swamp, or prairie, remnants of which can still be seen in surrounding areas. Of particular note is the Katy Prairie to the west, the Big Thicket to the northeast, and the Galveston Bay ecosystem to the south. Additionally, the metropolitan region is crossed by a number of creeks and bayous, which provide essential drainage during rainfall events; some of the most notable waterways include Buffalo Bayou (upon which Houston was founded), White Oak Bayou, Brays Bayou, Spring Creek, and the San Jacinto River. Greater Houston's flat topography, susceptibility to high-intensity rainfall events, high level of impervious surface, and inadequately-sized natural drainage channels make it particularly susceptible to catastrophic flooding events.

Geology
Underpinning Greater Houston's land surface are unconsolidated clays, clay shales, and poorly cemented sands up to several miles deep. The region's geology developed from stream deposits formed from the erosion of the Rocky Mountains. These sediments consist of a series of sands and clays deposited on decaying organic matter that, over time, transformed into oil and natural gas. Beneath these tiers is a water-deposited layer of halite, a rock salt. The porous layers were compressed over time and forced upward. As it pushed upward, the salt dragged surrounding sediments into dome shapes, often trapping oil and gas that seeped from the surrounding porous sands. This thick, rich soil also provides a good environment for rice farming in suburban outskirts into which the city of Houston continues to grow near Katy. Evidence of past rice farming is even still evident in developed areas as an abundance of rich, dark, loamy topsoil exists.

The Greater Houston region is generally earthquake-free. These faults generally move at a smooth rate in what is termed "fault creep".

Climate
Greater Houston has a humid subtropical climate typical of the Southern United States. It is rainy most of the year. Prevailing winds come from the south and southeast during most of the year, which bring heat and moisture from the nearby Gulf of Mexico and Galveston Bay area.

List of hurricanes
A number of tropical storms and hurricanes have hit the metropolitan area, including:
 1900 Galveston Hurricane, which devastated Galveston and was the deadliest natural disaster in United States history, killing between 8,000 and 12,000.
 Hurricane Carla (1961), which was the most recent Category 4 hurricane to strike Texas until Harvey in 2017.
 Hurricane Alicia (1983), which struck the area as a Category 3, and was at the time, the costliest Atlantic hurricane.
 Tropical Storm Allison (2001), until Harvey, which brought the worst flooding in Houston history and was the first tropical storm to be retired.
 Hurricane Rita (2005), which triggered one of the largest evacuations in United States history in the wake of Hurricane Katrina.
 Hurricane Ike (2008), which brought devastating storm surge to the coast and wind damage into the city.
 Hurricane Harvey (2017), which brought devastating flooding that resulted in excess of $100 billion in damages to Southeast Texas.
 Tropical Storm Imelda (2019) caused wide-spread flooding around Houston and surrounding areas. 
Hurricane Nicholas (2021), did moderate damage, and brought wind and rain to the area.

Metropolitan communities

Counties 
As defined by the U.S. Office of Management and Budget, the metropolitan area of Houston–The Woodlands–Sugar Land encompasses nine counties in Southeast Texas. They are listed below:

 Austin County
 Brazoria County
 Chambers County
 Fort Bend County
 Galveston County
 Harris County
 Liberty County
 Montgomery County
 Waller County

Communities

Five principal communities are designated within the Greater Houston metropolitan area. The Woodlands is a census-designated place; the rest are cities. They are listed below:

 Houston (2,325,502)
 The Woodlands (116,278)
 Sugar Land (118,600)
 Pasadena (154,193)
 Pearland (122,149)
 League City (106,244)
 Baytown (77,024)
 Conroe (98,081)
 Galveston (50,457)

Demographics

There were a total of 7,122,240 residents within the Greater Houston metropolitan area as of 2020, according to the United States Census Bureau. In 2010, Greater Houston had 5,920,416 residents and in 2000, it had a population of 4,177,646. Another 2010 estimate determined the population increased to 5,920,487. Of the population an estimated 575,000 were undocumented immigrants according to 2014 estimates.

In 2020, Greater Houston's racial makeup was 41% White (non-Hispanic white 34%), 17% Black and African American, 8% Asian and 3% from two or more races; additionally, 37% of the metropolitan population were Hispanic and Latino Americans of any race. Among its metropolitan population, roughly 23.4% were foreign-born. The largest foreign-born population came from Latin America, followed by Asia, Africa, Europe and other parts of North America. The metropolitan statistical area was classified as one of the largest regions where the three largest minority groups were highly represented. In 2018, its racial makeup had an estimated 35.5% Anglo American, 17% Black and African American, 7.6% Asian American and 2.1% other races; approximately 37.6% were Hispanic or Latino American of any race. Nearly one in four Greater Houstonians were foreign-born in 2018 and a quarter of all refugees settled in Texas lived in the region.

According to the 2019 American Community Survey, the median household income was $69,193 and the per capita income was $35,190. Roughly 13% of the metropolis lived at or below the poverty line. As of 2011, Greater Houston has four of Texas's 10 wealthiest communities, which include the wealthiest community, Hunters Creek Village, the fourth-wealthiest community, Bunker Hill Village, the fifth-wealthiest community, West University Place, and the sixth-wealthiest community, Piney Point Village.

Greater Houston's religious community is predominantly Christian and the second-largest metropolitan area that identifies with the religion in Texas after Dallas–Fort Worth (73%). In 2012, the city of Houston proper ranked the ninth most religious city in the U.S.

Within the Greater Houston metropolitan area, the Catholic Church is the largest single Christian denomination as of a 2014 study by the Pew Research Center. Catholics in Houston are primarily served by the Roman Catholic Archdiocese of Galveston–Houston. Following, the body of Evangelical Protestantism was the second largest according to this study; Baptists dominated the Evangelical Protestant demographic. Mainline Protestantism, led by Methodists, was the third largest Christian group.

In a separate study by the Association of Religion Data Archives in 2020, the Catholic Church numbered 1,299,901 for the metropolitan area; by 2020, the second-largest single Christian denomination (Southern Baptists) numbered 800,688; following, non-denominational Protestant churches represented the third-largest Christian cohort at 666,548.

Altogether, however, Baptists of the Southern Baptist Convention, the American Baptist Association, American Baptist Churches USA, Full Gospel Baptist Church Fellowship, National Baptist Convention USA and National Baptist Convention of America, and the National Missionary Baptist Convention numbered 926,554. Non-denominational Protestants, the Disciples of Christ, Christian Churches and Churches of Christ, and the Churches of Christ numbered 723,603 altogether according to the 2020 study.

Within the Eastern Christian tradition, there were 3,617 Coptic Orthodox Christians, 1,746 Eritrean Orthodox and 850 Ethiopian Orthodox, 6,209 Greek Orthodox, 2,405 Malankara Orthodox Syrians, 641 American Orthodox, and 1,058 Serbian Orthodox in the metropolis.

According to the Pew Research Center's 2014 study, non-Christian religions collectively made up 7% of the religious metropolitan population. The largest non-Christian religion was Judaism. According to the study, 20% of Greater Houston was irreligious and 2% were atheist. The Association of Religion Data Archives 2020 study determined there were 7,061 Conservative Jews and 3,050 Orthodox Jews; there were 11,481 Reform Jews throughout the area. There were an estimated 123,256 Muslims, 51,567 Hindus and Yoga practitioners, and 20,281 Buddhists.

Economy

Among the 10 most populous metropolitan areas in the U.S., Greater Houston ranked first in employment growth rate and second in nominal employment growth. In 2006, the Greater Houston metropolitan area ranked first in Texas and third in the U.S. within the category of "Best Places for Business and Careers" by Forbes.

The Houston–The Woodlands-Sugar Land area's gross metropolitan product (GMP) in 2005 was $308.7 billion, up 5.4% from 2004 in constant dollars—slightly larger than Austria's gross domestic product. By 2012, the GMP had risen to $449 billion, the fourth-largest of any metropolitan area in the United States. Only 26 countries other than the United States had a GDP exceeding Greater Houston's GAP. Mining, which in the area is almost entirely oil and gas exploration and production, accounted for 11% of Greater Houston's GAP—down from 21% as recently as 1985. The reduced role of oil and gas in Houston's GAP reflects the rapid growth of other sectors—such as engineering services, health services, retail, and manufacturing.

The area's economic activity is centered in the city of Houston, the county seat of Harris County. Houston is second to New York City in Fortune 500 headquarters. The city has attempted to build a banking industry, but the companies originally started in Houston have since merged with other companies nationwide. Banking, however, is still vital to the metropolitan region.

Galveston Bay and the Buffalo Bayou together form one of the most important shipping hubs in the world. The Port of Houston, the Port of Texas City, and the Port of Galveston are all major seaports located in this Greater Houston area. The area is also one of the leading centers of the energy industry, particularly petroleum processing, and many companies have large operations in this region. The metropolitan area also comprises the largest petrochemical manufacturing area in the world, including for synthetic rubber, insecticides, and fertilizers. The area is also the world's leading center for building oilfield equipment. Greater Houston is also a major center of biomedical research, aeronautics, and high technology.

Much of the metro area's success as a petrochemical complex is enabled by its busy man-made Houston Ship Channel. Because of these economic trades, many residents have moved to the Houston area from other U.S. states, as well as hundreds of countries worldwide. Unlike most places, where high fuel prices are seen as harmful to the economy, they are generally seen as beneficial for Houston, as many are employed in the energy industry. Baytown, Pasadena, La Porte, and Texas City have some of the area's largest petroleum/petrochemical plants, though major operations can be found in Houston, Anahuac, Clute, and other communities. Galveston has the largest cruise-ship terminal in Texas (and the 12th-largest in the world). The island, as well the Clear Lake area, are major recreation and tourism areas in the region.

Houston is home to the Texas Medical Center—the largest medical center in the world. Galveston is home to one of only two national biocontainment laboratories in the United States.

The University of Houston System's annual impact on the Houston-area's economy equates to that of a major corporation: $1.1 billion in new funds attracted annually to the Houston area, $3.13 billion in total economic benefit, and 24,000 local jobs generated. This is in addition to the 12,500 new graduates the UH System produces every year who enter the workforce in Houston and throughout Texas. These degree-holders tend to stay in Houston; after five years, 80.5% of graduates are still living and working in the region.

Sugar Land is home to the second-largest economic activities and fifth-largest city in the metropolitan area. It has the most important economic center in Fort Bend County. The city holds the Imperial Sugar (its namesake), Nalco Champion, and Western Airways headquarters. Engineering firms and other related industries have managed to take the place as an economic engine.

Sports

Major professional teams

Minor league and semipro teams

College sports (Division I)
Greater Houston is home to five NCAA Division I programs, with four located within Houston proper. The University of Houston and Rice University play in Division I (FBS). The University of Houston plays in the American Athletic Conference, while Rice belongs to Conference USA. Both schools were once part of the Southwest Conference. Texas Southern University and Prairie View A&M University, which are members of the Southwestern Athletic Conference, plays in Division I (FCS). Houston Christian University (formerly Houston Baptist University) currently plays in Division I (FCS), mainly in the Southland Conference. Rice and Houston Christian are widely noted for their student-athlete graduation rates, which number at 91% for Rice (tied for highest in the nation according to a 2002 Sports Illustrated issue on best college sports programs) and 80% for HBU.

Events
Houston is or has been home to various nationally known sporting events. The most notable is the Houston Livestock Show and Rodeo, which is the world's largest livestock exhibition and rodeo event. Other events of importance on greater Houston include the Shell Houston Open (a PGA Tour event), the U.S. Men's Clay Court Championships (ATP tour), the Houston Marathon, and the Texas Bowl college football bowl game. From 1959 to 1987, Houston hosted the Bluebonnet Bowl. Houston has also played host to three Super Bowls (VIII, XXXVIII, LI), the 1968, 1986, and 2004 MLB All-Star Games, the 2019, 2017, 2005 World Series, and the 1989, 2006, 2013 NBA All-Star Games. Houston has also played host to various high school and college sporting events, including the Big 12 Championship Game and hosted the 2011 NCAA Men's Final Four, 2010 NCAA Men's Regional Finals, and 2010 MLS All-Star Game. Houston has held two WrestleMania events, WrestleMania X-Seven and WrestleMania XXV, which is considered the biggest pro-wrestling event of the year, seen as the Super Bowl of pro-wrestling. Houston was also considered a candidate for the 2012 and 2016 Olympic Games.

Higher education

Five separate and distinct state universities are located within the Houston–The Woodlands–Sugar Land metropolitan area. The University of Houston is a nationally recognized Tier One research university, and is the flagship institution of the University of Houston System. The third-largest university in Texas, the University of Houston has nearly 43,000 students on its 667-acre campus in southeast Houston. The University of Houston–Clear Lake and the University of Houston–Downtown are standalone universities; they are not branch campuses of the University of Houston. The metropolitan area is home to the two largest historically black institutions in the state: Texas Southern University and Prairie View A&M University. The University of Texas Medical Branch and Texas A&M University at Galveston, a branch campus of Texas A&M University, are located in Galveston.

Several private institutions of higher learning—ranging from liberal arts colleges to a nationally recognized Tier One research university—are located within the metropolitan area. The University of St. Thomas is the only Catholic institution of higher education in Houston. Houston Christian University, located in the Sharpstown area, was founded in 1960. Rice University is one of the leading teaching and research universities of the United States and consistently ranks among the nation's top 20 universities by U.S. News & World Report.

Three community college districts exist with campuses in and around Houston. The Houston Community College System serves most of Houston. The northwestern through northeastern parts of the metropolitan area are served by various campuses of the Lone Star College System, while the southeastern portion of the city and some surrounding areas are served by San Jacinto College.

Eastern portions of the area and small sections of the city are served by Lee College. Portions of Fort Bend County are served by Wharton County Junior College. Portions of Galveston County are served by College of the Mainland and Galveston College. Portions of Brazoria County are served by Alvin Community College and Brazosport College. Blinn College serves portions of Austin County. The Houston Community College and Lone Star College systems are within the 10 largest institutions of higher learning in the United States.

Politics

Politically, the Greater Houston area has historically been divided between areas of strength of the Republican and Democratic parties.

Democrats are also stronger in the more liberal Neartown area, which is home to a large artist and LGBT community, and Alief, which houses a sizable Asian American population. In 2008, almost every county in the region voted for Republican John McCain; only Harris County was won by Democratic candidate Barack Obama, by a small margin (51%–49%). Galveston has long been a staunch Democratic stronghold, with the most active Democratic county establishment in the state.

United States Congress

Texas Legislature

Texas Senate

Texas House of Representatives

Culture
Houston's concentration of consular offices ranks third in the nation and first in the South, with 90 countries represented. The city of Houston is considered a major center of Black and African American political power, education, economic prosperity, and culture, often called the new black mecca after Atlanta, Georgia. Houston and its metropolitan area also has a sizable Hispanic and Latin American community. CNN/Money and Money magazine have recognized cities in the Greater Houston area the past three years as part of its "100 Best Places to Live in the United States". In 2005, Sugar Land, southwest of Houston in northeast Fort Bend County, was ranked 46th in the nation, and one of only three Texas cities among the Top 100. In 2006, the magazine recognized Sugar Land again, this time as the third-best city on its list. Also making the 2006 list were League City (65th) in northern Galveston County and The Woodlands (73rd) in southern Montgomery County. In 2007, another Houston suburb, Friendswood, made the list ranked 51st in the nation. The 2006 list only includes cities with at least 50,000 residents, and the 2007 list contains only cities with less than 50,000 residents.

Greater Houston is widely noted for its ethnic diversity and strong international community. In its 2010 publication "Urban Elite", A.T. Kearney added the city to their list of the 65 most important world cities and ranks Houston 35th, as "...a magnet for a diverse population and business services...". The Globalization and World Cities Study Group and Network ranks Houston as a Beta- World City, "an important world city instrumental to linking their region or state to the world economy."

Media

Houston–The Woodlands–Sugar Land metropolitan area is served by a public television station and one public radio station. KUHT (HoustonPBS) is a PBS member station and is the first public television station in the United States. Houston Public Radio is listener-funded radio and comprises one NPR member station, KUHF (KUHF News). The University of Houston System owns and holds broadcasting licenses to KUHT and KUHF. The stations broadcast from the Melcher Center for Public Broadcasting, located on the campus of the University of Houston. The metropolitan area is also served by ABC13 Houston (KTRK-TV) and Fox 26 Houston (KRIV-TV), owned-and-operated stations of ABC and Fox News, and NBC and CBS-affiliates KPRC 2 Houston and KHOU 11.

The Houston area is served by the Houston Chronicle, its only major daily newspaper with wide distribution. The Hearst Corporation, which owns and operates the Houston Chronicle, bought the assets of the Houston Post—its long-time rival and main competition—when Houston Post ceased operations in 1995. The Houston Post was owned by the family of former Lieutenant Governor Bill Hobby of Houston. The only other major publication to serve the city is the Houston Press—a free alternative weekly with a weekly readership of more than 300,000.

The Galveston County Daily News, founded in 1842, is that city's primary newspaper and the oldest continuously printed newspaper in Texas. It currently serves as the newspaper of record for Galveston, as well as Galveston County. Radio station KGBC, on air since 1947, has also served as a local media outlet.

Transportation

Highways

Houston's freeway system includes  of freeways and expressways in the 10-county metro area. The State of Texas plans to spend $65 billion on Houston area highways by 2025. Houston freeways are heavily traveled and often under construction to meet the demands of continuing growth.

The Greater Houston area has a hub-and-spoke freeway structure with multiple loops. The innermost is Interstate 610, forming a roughly -circumference loop around downtown. The nearly square Loop 610 is quartered into "North Loop", "South Loop", "West Loop", and "East Loop". A planned highway project, State Highway 99 (the Grand Parkway), will form the third loop outside of Houston. Currently, a completed portion of State Highway 99 runs from U.S. Highway 59, Near New Caney, to U.S. Highway 59 in Sugar Land, southwest of Houston, and was completed in 2016. Another segment of State Highway 99 from Interstate 10 south to Farm-to-Market Road 1405 in Chambers County was completed in 2008. The next portion to be constructed is from the current terminus at U.S. Highway 59 to Interstate 10 in Chambers County. Freeways also include the Westpark Tollway, which runs from U.S. Hwy 59 to Texas Hwy 99 and the Fort Bend Parkway, which runs from U.S. Hwy 90-A to Texas Hwy 6 in Missouri City. When completed in the future, Interstate 69 will start at the Mexico–US border, go through the Greater Houston area, and continue on to Michigan at the Canada–US border. All of Interstate 69 has been completed in the Greater Houston area and is co-signed with U.S. Highway 59. Interstate 45, which starts at State Highway 75 in Dallas provides transport from Houston to Dallas.

Mass transit

The Metropolitan Transit Authority of Harris County, Texas, or METRO, provides public transportation in the form of buses, trolleys, and lift vans.

METRO began running light rail service (METRORail) on January 1, 2004. Currently, the track is rather short — about 22.7 miles (20.6 km) from Northline Transit Center Station through downtown Houston to the Texas Medical Center and Reliant Park, and lines from downtown to the East End and the University of Houston/Lower 3rd Ward. Still, the system is traveled by about 61,000 people daily, giving it the second-highest ridership per track mile in the nation.  The Uptown Light Rail Line has been converted to a BRT Line and began construction in the late second quarter of 2016. The BRT Line will run between the former NW Mall (which is in the process of redevelopment) and the WestPark TC. METRO's various forms of public transportation still do not connect multiple suburbs to the inner city (defined by the 610 loop), causing Houstonians to rely on the automobile as a primary source of transportation.  The problem is one due to the lack of a central metropolitan area transportation authority, primarily due to a few suburban counties refusing to cooperate with METRO.  For example, there are multiple coach bus services that run into downtown Houston. METRO is in the late planning stages of the US 90 Commuter line which will service the Ft Bend County and SW Harris County suburban region. Prior to the opening of METRORail, Houston was the largest major city in the United States without a rail transit system.

Following a successful referendum held locally in 2004, METRO is currently in the beginning design phases of a 10-year expansion plan to add five more sections to connect to the current rail system. An 8.3-mile (13.4-km) expansion has been approved to run the service from Uptown through Texas Southern University, ending at the University of Houston campus.

Some areas in east Harris County are served by Harris County Transit.

Airports

Houston's largest airport George Bush Intercontinental Airport, is located in north Houston.  It is the second largest hub for United Airlines.

In 2010, Continental Airlines moved its headquarters from downtown Houston to downtown Chicago upon its merger with United Airlines. The southeast of Houston has William P. Hobby Airport, the second-largest commercial passenger airport. Houston's third-largest airport is Ellington Field, which houses several National Guard and Air National Guard units, as well as a United States Coast Guard air station and the Lyndon B. Johnson Space Center's fleet of jets that are used to train astronauts. Sugar Land has the Sugar Land Regional Airport, which is the fourth-largest airport in the metropolitan area. Both Sugar Land Regional and Ellington Field serve as reliever airports for the Houston Airport System.

Intercity rail
Amtrak provides intercity rail service to the Houston station.

Intercity bus
Greyhound Bus Lines operates services from three bus stations in the City of Houston:
 Houston Greyhound Station at 2121 South Main Street
 Americanos U.S. L.L.C. (Houston Southeast) at 7218 Harrisburg Blvd.
 Agencia Autobuses (Houston Southwest) at 6590 Southwest Freeway
In addition, Greyhound operates services from two stops
 Houston Aau
 Houston (Amtrak station)
Greyhound also operates services to stops within other cities in the Greater Houston area, including:
 Angleton (at Save Step Food Mart)
 Baytown (at Baytown Travel Express)
 Conroe (at Shell)
 Katy (at Sunmart Texaco)
 Prairie View (at Unco Food Store)
 Rosenberg (at Shell-McDonald's)

Three Megabus stations additionally serve the Houston area:
 Downtown – a parking lot located at 815 Pierce St. across the street from METRO's Downtown Transit Center
 Northwest Houston – a Shell gas station located at 13250 FM 1960
 Katy Mills Mall – at Entrance 5, 5000 Katy Mills Circle

See also
 Harris County, Texas

Notes

References

Further reading
 
 "Regional Growth Forecast 2035." (Archive) Houston-Galveston Area Council (H-GAC). August 2006.

External links
Greater Houston Partnership
The Center for Houston's Future

 
Geography of Houston
Geography of Harris County, Texas
Geography of Fort Bend County, Texas
Geography of Montgomery County, Texas
Geography of Galveston County, Texas
Regions of Texas
Metropolitan areas of Texas